Bandhobi is a 2009 South Korean independent film directed by Shin Dong-il, about a frustrated and rebellious high school student who ends up becoming a friend of a migrant worker from Bangladesh who is desperate to receive his unpaid wages back. The title means "female friend" in Bengali.

Lead actor Mahbub Alam is a longtime resident of South Korea who entered the country as a migrant worker. He has since appeared in small film roles and become involved in various activist projects, including the launch of the Migrant Worker Film Festival, for which he serves as festival director.

Plot
Karim (Mahbub Alam) is a 27-year-old Bangladeshi working in an industrial laundry. An intellectual whose academic degree was not recognized in South Korea, Karim's work permit is about to expire and he's still owed a year's pay by a previous employer, Shin (Jung Dong-gyu), who's not taking his calls; meanwhile, his wife back home is giving him a hard time about money problems.

Seventeen-year-old high schooler Min-seo (Baek Jin-hee) is a social loner at odds with her mother, Eun-joo (Lee Il-hwa), who has a jobless, live-in lover, Ki-hong (Park Hyuk-kwon), whom she's planning to marry. Minseo's friends all take after-school classes at study institutes, but her single mother can't afford to pay for them. She eventually gets an under the table job at a massage parlor in order to pay for English classes.

On the first day of summer vacation, Min-seo is riding the bus when Karim drops his wallet. He exits the bus, and Min-seo takes the wallet for herself. However, Karim soon realizes what happens and manages to chase Min-seo down in a side street. "Let's go to the police station," he says in excellent Korean, but Min-seo tries to dissuade Karim from reporting her to the police by offering to grant him a favor, and reluctantly agrees to help track down his former boss. As the unlikely pair pose as loan sharks, they find themselves transforming each other's worlds in unexpected ways. They slowly form a mutual understanding, with the girl asking indiscreet questions and the gentleman preaching about problems in South Korean society. For Min-seo, Karim is initially a convenient badge she can wear in a society she sees herself at war with. But as she lowers her defenses, the relationship touchingly turns into a friendship between two lonely souls. But Karim's visa will not last forever.

Cast

Mahbub Alam - Karim
Baek Jin-hee - Min-seo
Lee Il-hwa - Eun-joo
Park Hyuk-kwon - Ki-hong
Jung Dong-gyu - Representative Shin
Kim Jae-rok - Homeroom teacher
Kwon Hyuk-poong - Drunkard
Hyun Won-hee - Ji-yeong
Kim Mi-hee - Min-seo's friend
Park Yeong - Gas station owner
Choi In-sook - Representative Shin's wife
Seo Wang-seok - Immigration control worker
Jang Sebastian - Heinz
Noh Jin-woo - Factory department manager
Jung Sung-hoon - Factory worker
Lee Dong-gyu - Convenience store worker/part-timer
Yang Hae-hoon - Son at gas station
Oh Chang-kyung - Detective Oh
Jang Dae-yoon - Detective Jang
Jo Eun-kyung - Massage section chief
Shin Yi-soo - Massage guest
Baek Geon-yeong - Businessman
Bang Yeong-seon - Convenience store guest
Kim Sun, Kim Dong-myeong - Jogging couple
Kang Bo-mi - Academy student
Sonia - Trisha
Yoon Sung-ho - Passerby
Jung Byung-gil - Passerby

Awards
2010 23rd Castellinaria International Youth Film Festival: Utopia Prize
2009 31st Festival of the Three Continents: Best Film Award
2009 3rd Tanabe Benkei Film Festival: Jury's Special Award, Cinematic Jury's Award
2009 11th Seoul International Youth Film Festival: Audience Award - Discovery of Korea Coming-of-Age Film
2009 10th Jeonju International Film Festival: Audience Critics' Award, CJ CGV Distribution Support Award

References

External links
  
 
 
 

2009 films
2009 drama films
South Korean independent films
South Korean drama films
Films about immigration
Films about race and ethnicity
Films set in Seoul
Films shot in Seoul
2000s Korean-language films
2009 independent films
2000s Bengali-language films
2000s South Korean films